The Wildgall is, at 3,273 metres above sea level, the third highest peak in the Rieserferner Group, a range in the western part of the High Tauern. It lies within the Italian provinces of South Tyrol in the Rieserferner-Ahrn Nature Park (Parco Naturale Vedrette di Ries-Aurina) and appears from the south as a massive pyramid with prominent arêtes. It is the most difficult of the summits of the Rieserferner Group to climb. As a result, it was conquered relatively late. Its first recorded ascent was on 18 August 1872 by Victor Hecht from Prague and mountain guides Johann and Sepp Ausserhofer from Rein in Taufers. Today the mountain may be climbed from the Kasseler Hut (Italian: Rifugio Roma alla Vedrette di Ries) to the north in about four hours, but it is rarely attempted.

Literature and maps 
 Werner Beikircher: Alpenvereinsführer Rieserfernergruppe, Bergverlag Rudolf Rother, 1983, 
 Helmut Dumler: Gebietsführer Südtirol 3, Bergverlag Rudolf Rother, Munich, 1987, 
 Carl Diener in Eduard Richter (ed.): Die Erschließung der Ostalpen, Vol. III, Berlin, 1894
 Casa Editrice Tabacco, Tavagnacco, Wanderkarte 1:25,000, Sheet 035, Valle Aurina/Ahrntal, Vedrette di Ries/Rieserferner-Gruppe

References

External links 

Mountains of South Tyrol
Alpine three-thousanders
Rieserferner Group
Rieserferner-Ahrn Nature Park